Thalassocyonidae is a family of sea snails in the superfamily Tonnoidea and the order Littorinimorpha.

Genera
The only two genera within the family Thalassocyonidae are:
 Distorsionella Beu, 1978
 Thalassocyon Barnard, 1960

References